Ojala is a Finnish and Estonian surname. Notable people with the surname include:

 Antero Ojala (1916–1988), Finnish speed skater
 Arvo Ojala (1920–2005), American Hollywood technical adviser 
 Janne Ojala (born 1977), Finnish tennis player
 Juhani Ojala (born 1989), Finnish professional footballer
 Kirt Ojala (born 1968), American major league baseball player
 Mika Ojala (born 1988), Finnish professional footballer
 William R. Ojala (1925–2018), American politician and lawyer

Estonian-language surnames
Finnish-language surnames